Nkolbissonia is a genus of beetles belonging to the family Cerylonidae.

Species:

Nkolbissonia mirei

References

Cerylonidae